Crossley is a surname of Old English origin deriving from two locations called Crossley in West Yorkshire.

Crossley may refer to:

 Ada Crossley (1874–1929), Australian singer
 Andrew Crossley, British solicitor, partner in closed law firm ACS:Law
 Anthony Crossley (1903–1939), British writer and Conservative Party politician
 Bob Crossley (1912–2010), English abstract artist
 Bryn Crossley (1958–2018), Welsh jockey
 Callie Crossley, American journalist, host of "The Callie Crossley Show"
 Edward Crossley (1841–1905), English businessman and Liberal Party politician
 Francis Crossley (1817–1872), British carpet manufacturer and philanthropist
 Frank Crossley (actor) (1874–1943), Australian comic actor
 Geoffrey Crossley (1921–2002), British racing driver
 Geoffrey Allan Crossley (1920–2009), British diplomat
 Herbert Crossley (1901–1921), English heavyweight boxer
 Hugh Crossley (born 1971), British hotel owner and aristocrat
 James Crossley (bodybuilder) (born 1973), English bodybuilder and actor
 James Crossley (author) (1800–1883), English author, bibliophile and literary scholar
 James Crossley (rugby league), English rugby league footballer who played the 1930s and 1940s
 John Crossley (1812–1879), British politician
 John Crossley Jr. (born 1956), English rugby league footballer who played in the 1970s and 1980s
 Kelsey-Beth Crossley (born 1992), English actress
 Kevin Crossley-Holland (born 1941), English children's author
 Lloyd Crossley (1860–1926), Anglican Bishop of Auckland, New Zealand
 Mark Crossley (born 1969), English born Wales goalkeeper
 Mark Crossley (broadcaster) (born 1987), English Radio DJ
 Mark Crossley (musician), Canadian musician
 Matt Crossley (born 1968), English footballer
 Michael Crossley (1912–1987), Royal Air Force flying ace
 Pamela Kyle Crossley (born 1955), American historian
 Paul Crossley (pianist) (born 1944), British pianist
 Paul Crossley (footballer) (1948–1996), English professional footballer
 Richard Crossley (born 1969), Maltese, English professional fashion photographer
 Richard Crossley (born 1970), English professional footballer
 Rosemary Crossley (born 1945), Australian author
 Roy Crossley (1923–2003), English footballer
 Shanna Crossley (born 1983), American professional basketball player
 Steve Crossley (born 1990), English rugby league footballer who played in the 2010s
 Syd Crossley (1885–1960), English film actor
 Thomas Crossley, English 19th-century professional footballer
 Wallace Crossley (1874–1943), publisher and 29th Lieutenant Governor of Missouri

See also
 Savile Crossley, 1st Baron Somerleyton (1857–1935), British Liberal Unionist politician
 Sir William Crossley, 1st Baronet (1844–1911), British engineer and Liberal politician

References

English-language surnames
English toponymic surnames
Surnames of English origin